Malcolm Esajas (born 13 July 1986) is a Dutch footballer who plays for JOS Watergraafsmeer in the Derde Divisie.

Club career
Esajas formerly played for MVV Maastricht and ADO Den Haag, who loaned him to RKC Waalwijk in the 2014-15 season. He joined FC Den Bosch in summer 2015, only to be deemed surplus to requirements a year later.

In summer 2017 Esajas returned to former club AFC after spending a year without a club.

References

1986 births
Living people
Dutch sportspeople of Surinamese descent
Footballers from Amsterdam
Association football wingers
Dutch footballers
MVV Maastricht players
ADO Den Haag players
RKC Waalwijk players
FC Den Bosch players
Amsterdamsche FC players
Eredivisie players
Eerste Divisie players
Tweede Divisie players
Derde Divisie players
JOS Watergraafsmeer players